Pila speciosa is a species of freshwater snail in the family Ampullariidae, the apple snails.

Distribution 
It has been recorded in Ethiopia, Kenya and Somalia.

Description

References

External links

Ampullariidae
Gastropods described in 1849
Taxonomy articles created by Polbot